Grossi is a surname. Notable people with the surname include:

 Alex Grossi (born 1976), American guitarist
 Camillo Grossi (1876–1941), Italian general
 Carlo Grossi (born c. 1634; died 1688), Italian composer and singer
 Cayetano Domingo Grossi (1854–1900), first serial killer in Argentinian history
 Eduardo Vio Grossi (1944–2022), Chilean lawyer and judge
 Elia Grossi (born 1974), Italian former professional tennis player
 Enzo Grossi (1908–1960), Officer in Italian Navy during World War II
 Esther Pillar Grossi (born 1936), Brazilian educator and federal deputy in Rio Grande do Sul

 Franco Grossi (born 1939), Italian discus thrower
 Gabriele Grossi (born 1972), Italian professional football player
 Giordana Grossi, cognitive neuroscientist and psychologist
 Giovanni Francesco Grossi (1653–1697), Italian singer of bel canto
 Guy Grossi (born 1965), Australian Chef and media personality
 Jorge Rodríguez Grossi (born 1947), Chilean politician
 José Nicomedes Grossi (1915–2009), Brazilian bishop
 Lodovico Grossi da Viadana (c. 1560–1627), Italian composer, teacher, and Franciscan friar of the Order of Minor Observants
 Lorenzo Grossi (born 1998), Italian professional footballer 
 Marzia Grossi (born 1970), Italian former professional tennis player
 Oreste Grossi (1912–2008), Italian rower
 Orietta Grossi (born 1959), Italian basketball player
 Paolo Grossi (born 1985), Italian professional football player
 Paolo Grossi (judge) (born 1933), Italian judge
 Patrick Grossi (born 1942), Republican member of the Illinois House of Representatives
 Pietro Grossi (1917–2002), Italian composer of computer music, visual artist and hacker
 Rafael Grossi (born 1961), Argentine diplomat
 Tommaso Grossi (1791–1853), Lombard poet and novelist
 Tony Grossi (born 1958), American radio/TV personality
 Jillian Grossi (born 2001), American/ Italian Hair stylist

Others 

 plural for Venetian grosso, a silver coin first introduced in Venice in 1193 under doge Enrico Dandolo